Plou is a commune in the Cher département in the Centre-Val de Loire region of France.

Geography

Population

Sights
 The church of St. Pierre, originally from the 11th century, was partly reconstructed after the English occupation during the Hundred Years' War. The interior wooden vaults date from the 11th century.
 The ruins of a 14th-century castle, the Château de Font-Moreau.
 The château of Castelnau at Brouillamnon was originally a wooden castle, rebuilt in stone around 1100. It was transformed into a Renaissance home in 1541. In its present form, it dates from the 18th century.

Notable people
Louis Béchereau (1880–1970), aeronautical engineer
Théophile Marion Dumersan (1780–1849), writer and numismatist

References

Communes of Cher (department)